Cameron John Colvin (born March 5, 1986) is a former American football player, having played for the De La Salle Spartans and Oregon Ducks. He was portrayed by Ser'Darius Blain in the 2014 film When the Game Stands Tall, about his high school football team, the De La Salle Spartans.

Early years
He is the son of John and Veronica Colvin and has an older sister. Both of his parents died before he turned 16. His friend and fellow teammate, Terrance Kelly, was shot and murdered the day before they were to leave for the University of Oregon.

Colvin played high school football at De La Salle High School in Concord, California. During his career, he achieved numerous awards and honors, his highest being ranked as the #2 wide receiver in the nation and being a US Army All-American selection. In the U.S. Army All-American Bowl, Cameron caught two touchdowns. His senior class at De La Salle held “The Streak,” a 151-game-winning streak that is the longest in American football history.

College career
As a high school senior, Colvin announced his decision to attend the University of Oregon live on ESPN. He saw time as a true freshman for the Ducks, making 2 TD catches against the Washington Huskies. Colvin suffered an assortment of injuries in the first three years of his career. With the arrival of new offensive coordinator Chip Kelly during his senior year, Colvin became one of quarterback Dennis Dixon's favorite targets and leading receivers in the nation during the early 2007 season. On October 13, 2007, in a game against Washington State University, he broke his ankle and missed the remainder of the season. He finished his college career with 74 receptions for 892 yards (0.82 km) and seven touchdowns. Cameron was a Political Science student in the University's College of Arts and Sciences and was also active on campus, becoming a member of the Gamma Pi chapter of the Pi Kappa Alpha fraternity.

Professional career
Colvin was signed to the San Francisco 49ers on April 27, 2008.  He missed a few OTA's and some training camp days due to school obligations, which affected his performance. He did however earn high praise from the offensive coordinator Mike Martz. “He’s physical. He uses his speed, and he goes after the ball. I’m very pleased with him. He doesn’t make many mistakes. He’s come out of the blue. We weren’t really counting on him to be a factor, but all of a sudden, he’s looking pretty good.” He played for the Las Vegas Locomotives of the United Football League in 2011.

References

1986 births
Living people
American football wide receivers
African-American players of American football
Oregon Ducks football players
Players of American football from California
Sportspeople from the San Francisco Bay Area
People from Pittsburg, California
21st-century African-American sportspeople
20th-century African-American people